Wang Xueqin (born January 1, 1991 in Jiangsu) is a Chinese long-distance runner. She competed in the marathon at the 2012 Summer Olympics, placing 22nd with a time of 2:28:31.

References

1991 births
Living people
Chinese female marathon runners
Olympic athletes of China
Athletes (track and field) at the 2012 Summer Olympics
Runners from Jiangsu
World Athletics Championships athletes for China
People from Changshu
Chinese female long-distance runners
Sportspeople from Suzhou
20th-century Chinese women
21st-century Chinese women